Vernon Charles Knowles (December 20, 1897 – 1985) was a politician in Ontario, Canada. He represented Hamilton Centre in the Legislative Assembly of Ontario from 1945 to 1948 as a Conservative.

The son of Robert C. Knowles and Caroline Mary Buck, he was born in St. Thomas and was educated in Toronto and New York City. His mother was a direct descendant of Laura Secord. In 1930, Knowles married Ina Jean McVittie. He worked as a sales manager and served on Hamilton city council from 1943 to 1945.

References 

1897 births
1985 deaths
Progressive Conservative Party of Ontario MPPs